is a Japanese group rhythmic gymnast. Being World champion and 10-time Asian champion, she is widely considered to be the most successful Japanese rhythmic gymnast ever.

Career 
She has participated at the 2012 Summer Olympics and finished on 7th place in Group All-Around final.

She has competed at world championships, including at the 2015 World Rhythmic Gymnastics Championships, where she won the bronze medal in the 5 ribbons event and eventually competed alongside her teammates Airi Hatakeyama, Sakura Noshitani, Sayuri Sugimoto and Kiko Yokota at the 2016 Summer Olympics in Rio de Janeiro, finishing outside of medals in the group all-around final with an eight-place score of 34.200.

On September 16–22, she and her teammates competed at the 2019 World Championships, her third. They won silver medal in Group All-around and 3 Hoops + 4 Clubs Final and won gold in 5 Balls Final. This was Japanese first ever gold medal in group event at World Championships.

References

External links
 
 
 
 Rie Matsubara Pictures and Photos - Getty Images
 
 

1993 births
Living people
Japanese rhythmic gymnasts
Place of birth missing (living people)
Olympic gymnasts of Japan
Medalists at the Rhythmic Gymnastics World Championships
Gymnasts at the 2012 Summer Olympics
Gymnasts at the 2016 Summer Olympics
Gymnasts at the 2020 Summer Olympics
21st-century Japanese women